Portalegre Municipality may refer to:
 Portalegre Municipality, Portugal, a municipality in Portalegre District, Portugal.
 Portalegre, Rio Grande do Norte, a municipality in the state of Rio Grande do Norte in the Northeast region of Brazil.

Municipality name disambiguation pages